openDesktop.org is a libre website portal offering personal cloud services like storage and communication services, as well as public services in form of a store for libre (Open source/creative commons) content publishing and a code hosting site for open development.

Features

Main Site

The goal of opendesktop.org is the advancement of free software and libre computing technologies via hosting free-as-in-freedom-and-beer services for the community.

Opendesktop.org Personal Services

As of 2019, Opendesktop has extended its offerings of free alternatives to proprietary services, like file sharing, contact and calendar management, chat and messaging. All these services are based on libre software components, like Nextcloud, Discourse or Element (Matrix client) for the chat.

Pling.com 

A major part of opendesktop.org's services is pling.com. It's a place where developers, artists and users come together sharing more than 100,000 user generated contents and generating over 90 million page impressions per month. It allows the publishing of any kind of libre content like themes, wallpapers, software applications and add-ons, as well as other creative content like audio, videos or comics, provided the content is released under liberal licensing terms like the GPL or Creative Commons. This content can then be downloaded or directly installed by everyone without registration or any other limitation or cost. Registered users can up- or downvote content, add comments and upload new content such as applications, themes, add-ons or other libre content. Community members can also decide to sponsor certain content with a monthly donation.
In that regard openDesktop.org's Pling is one of the biggest online communities for making such content available, serving as platform for the official KDE Store and other sites that are organized in sub-groups such as gnome-look.org, xfce-look.org and many others.

Supporting via Donations

The social community aspect of the portal has been a driving factor early on. According to the project site a dedicated community is a key factor to improve the quality of open source and to ultimately grow Linux Desktop. Today the acceptance of FLOSS projects and CC artwork is growing, as is the willingness to support quality content via monetary support of the creators of such content. One primary goal for Pling is to encourage free software users to support the various subgroups of the platform via donations.

OCS API 

Pling.com uses the  Open Collaboration Services API, or short OCS API, which is a certified standard protocol of freedesktop.org. KDE SC 4 was the first project to make use of the OCS API. Nowadays KDE Plasma 5 and various KDE-applications use the OCS API via the KNewStuff framework.

Opencode.net
Opencode.net is a part of the Opendesktop providing development services for the community. It is based on GitLab, with the possibility to build binaries via CI and integrate any project with Opendesktops publishing service Pling.com.

Growth and Statistics 
In the beginning of December 2001, 2000 users were registered on the sites. About 0.8 million page impressions per month were made. A year later, in 2002 there were 6000 registered users and 3 million page impressions. Heavy growth for more than 8 years lead to more than 130.000 registered users from over 100 countries in 2009. Over 90 million page impressions per month are reached with more than 6 Terabytes traffic per month. 2.5 million people visit openDesktop.org every month.

History 
The first website of the portal, KDE-Look.org, was started in the year 2001 by Frank Karlitschek. Shortly many similar sites with focus on other open source themes such as GNOME were launched. In 2007 the openDesktop.org got established as an umbrella page for the whole network that summarizes the content from the sites such as Xfce-Look.org, GNOME-Look.org or Linux-Apps.com, which now continue under pling.com.
In January 2016 Frank Karlitschek sold hive01 to Blue Systems GmbH.
Today openDesktop.org is a global meeting place for free software enthusiasts from all over the world. The websites are operated and maintained by the hive01 GmbH, based in Bielefeld, Germany.

References

External links
openDesktop.org website 

GNOME
KDE
Social Desktop
Social networking services